Allen Howard Weisselberg (born August 15, 1947) is an American businessman who was the chief financial officer (CFO) of the Trump Organization. Weisselberg served as a co-trustee of a trust set up in 2017 by Donald Trump before Trump's inauguration as president of the United States. Weisselberg pleaded guilty to 15 criminal charges including grand larceny, criminal tax fraud and falsifying business records on August 18, 2022. He was sentenced to five months in jail and began serving his time on Jan 10, 2023 with a projected release date of 19 April 2023.

Early life
Weisselberg was born in Brooklyn, New York, and grew up in the borough's Brownsville neighborhood. He is of Jewish descent. He graduated from Thomas Jefferson High School in nearby East New York, before receiving a Bachelor of Science in accounting from Pace University in 1970.

Career
Weisselberg began working as an accountant for Gravesend-based real estate magnate Fred Trump in 1973. By the late 1980s, he was controller of the company (which had relocated its main office to Midtown Manhattan under the auspices of Donald Trump) and reported to Stephen Bollenbach, his predecessor as chief financial officer.

In 2000, Weisselberg was named chief financial officer and vice president of Trump Hotels & Casino Resorts. He also was a board member and treasurer of the Donald J. Trump Foundation. In 2017, Weisselberg said in a deposition to New York State investigators that he was not aware he was a board member "at least for the last 10 or 15 years".  He has also handled the household expenses of the Trump family. Along with Donald Trump, he is one of two trustees of a New York-based revocable trust that in turn owns DT Connect Member Corp.

On January 11, 2017, shortly before Donald Trump's inauguration as president of the United States, the Trump Organization announced that Weisselberg would manage the company along with Eric Trump and Donald Trump Jr. during Trump's presidency. A summary of trust arrangements dated February 10, 2018, lists Weisselberg and Donald Trump Jr. as trustees, and Eric Trump as an adviser. The summary also indicated that, as trustees, only Weisselberg and Trump Jr. knew the details of the trust's finances.

Payments to Stormy Daniels

Michael Cohen, Trump's personal lawyer at the start of his presidency, said that Weisselberg had arranged for the Trump Organization to pay Cohen $35,000 a month, to reimburse him for hush money Trump had asked Cohen to pay adult film actress Stormy Daniels in the weeks before the 2016 election, to keep her from talking publicly about an affair she says she had with Trump. In July 2018, Weisselberg was subpoenaed to testify before a federal grand jury regarding the Cohen investigation. Weisselberg was granted limited witness immunity for his testimony. New York County District Attorney Cyrus Vance Jr. was also investigating Weisselberg. When the federal investigation by the U.S. District Court for the Southern District of New York "effectively concluded" in July 2019, Vance issued new subpoenas in connection with the hush-money payments. Weisselberg's federal immunity does not extend to state investigations.

Tax Fraud and Prison 
Vance stepped up his state criminal investigation in February 2021, after the US Supreme Court authorized Trump's accountants to turn over Trump's personal and business tax records to him. Vance's office then reportedly focused its investigation on Weisselberg, as well as on Donald Trump Jr. and Eric Trump, allegedly with the goal of pressuring Weisselberg to "flip" and testify against his employer.  The New York Times reported that investigators had also asked at least one witness about Weisselberg’s sons—Barry, who had managed Wollman Rink, and Jack, who works at Ladder Capital, a Trump Organization lender. By March 2021, prosecutors were examining financial records of Weisselberg and his family members. His former daughter-in-law Jen Weisselberg, who was married to Barry Weisselberg from 2004 until 2018, released to the Manhattan DA numerous documents that revealed how some Trump employees received compensation in real estate and other items.

CNN reported in May 2021 that the New York State Attorney General had opened a criminal tax investigation into Weisselberg months earlier. The investigation was pursued by the Manhattan District Attorney's office. In June, a grand jury heard evidence against him. Weisselberg surrendered to the Manhattan District Attorney's office in New York City on July 1, 2021, hours before the grand jury's indictments against him and the Trump Organization were unsealed. Weisselberg was charged with 15 felony counts for evading $344,745 in taxes over 15 years. He initially pleaded not guilty, but on August 18, 2022, he pleaded guilty to all 15 counts of grand larceny, criminal tax fraud and falsifying business records. As part of the guilty plea deal, he agreed to testify against The Trump Organization at trial and to pay "almost $2 million in back taxes, interest and penalties and waive any right to appeal."

In November 2022, Weisselberg testified at the Trump Organization's tax fraud trial, stating that the real estate company cleaned up its tax practices in anticipation of additional scrutiny after Trump entered the White House and left his sons, Donald Trump Jr. and Eric Trump, in control. Weisselberg also testified that during the cleanup, Trump's sons knew the company paid executives' personal expenses that were not reported as income, and provided bonuses as if they were independent contractors.

On January 10, 2023, Weisselberg was sentenced to five months in the infirmary unit of Rikers Island with a projected release date of 19 April 2023.

Personal life

In 1978, Weisselberg purchased a modest ranch-style house in Wantagh, New York, a suburban hamlet in Long Island's Nassau County. This would remain his primary residence until 2013, when he and his wife, Hilary, sold the property for $468,000 and "moved into a high floor" of a luxury apartment building in the Trump Organization's Riverside South development on the Upper West Side of Manhattan. In 2002, the couple bought a vacation home in Boynton Beach, Florida. Former daughter-in-law Jennifer Weisselberg has asserted that Donald Trump disparaged the Wantagh residence at a 2004 family shiva. She added: "He has more feelings and adoration for Donald than for his wife... For Donald, it's a business. But for Allen, it's a love affair.”

His son Jack Weisselberg is a loan-origination executive at Ladder Capital, which has acted as a lender to the Trump Organization. Another son, Barry Weisselberg, has managed the Trump Organization's Central Park ice rinks.

In 2004, Allen Weisselberg appeared as a judge on the seventh episode of the second season of The Apprentice.

See also
List of Pace University people

References

External links

1947 births
Living people
21st-century American businesspeople
American chief financial officers
American construction businesspeople
American corporate directors
American people convicted of tax crimes
20th-century American Jews
Businesspeople from New York City
Pace University alumni
The Trump Organization employees
Thomas Jefferson High School (Brooklyn) alumni
People from Brownsville, Brooklyn
21st-century American Jews